Samandöken is a village in the Göle District, Ardahan Province, Turkey. Its population is 788 (2021).

History 

Original name of the village before establishment of Turkey was Sinot. The name of the village was changed in the early years of the Turkey; public officers visited the village during harvest time, and they saw lots of hay shed on the way to the village and decided to name the village as "hay dropers". During the Russo-Turkish War (1877–78) a lot of Caucasian Muslim families settled in the village but on the final days of the war some of the refugees from the Caucasus together with some local families left the village and immigrated to Erzurum Aşkale. Approximately 18-20 families have founded the village Haydarhac. Later some other families left the village due to economical problems during Russian rule. Most of those families did not return to the village after Russian rule.

Culture 

Muslim Anatolian culture and traditions still live in the village.

In the late years of the Ottoman Empire, the region witnessed several wars, and during the war time population forced to leave the village, however most of the families returned to the village after wars ended. The village consists of several families, namely: Yılmaz, Usanmaz, Akçora, Polat, Kaya, Karakaş, Karakuş, Yilmaz, Akkoyun, Akkaya, Palavan, Aydınlar, Taşdemir, Şahin, Beyazgül, Demir, Ergüner,Erdaş, Saraç. Also some immigrant families Ataç, Parlak. Cross marriages within the families made the ties between families very strong that made the war times relatively easier for the population. Barter trade and help cooperation plays a very important role for the village especially in producing Turkish carpet. For example at homes daughters us imece (collective work) to produce carpets. Similarly, until 1990s laundry, wool washing or gathering stones from arable lands used to be done collectively in the rivers during summer days.

Geography 
The village is 59 km from the Ardahan city center, and 14 km from the Göle district. The village has two districts: the Old Town and the New Street (Yeni Mahalle) districts. The summer village (Yayla) is 2.2 km away from the Yeni Mahalle district, and 4.0 km away from the Old Town. The summer village lies between the winter village and Göle.

Climate 
The climate of the village is in the continental climate domain. Temperatures reflect the most prominent features of the climate; summers are hot and dry, winters are cold and rainy. However, Ardahan, Kars and Erzurum plateau has its own climate that experiences an even heavier winter. Sometimes weather is as cold as -30 Celsius degrees. As an effect of the global warming in recent years, the climate became more clement. The region experiences meters of snow. It is not uncommon to experience snowstorms where snow reaches house heights.

Population 
Samandoken is one of the biggest villages of Göle District, but the population swells mostly in the summer when elder population visits the village for summer holidays.

References

Villages in Göle District